Menno Community Hall, near Kendall, Kansas was built during 1936-1937 as a Works Progress Administration project.
 It was listed on the National Register of Historic Places in 2003.  It was designed by Howard T. Blanchard of Garden City, Kansas in WPA Rustic architecture.

It was built of local brown limestone walls upon a concrete foundation.

References

Event venues on the National Register of Historic Places in Kansas
Government buildings completed in 1937
National Register of Historic Places in Hamilton County, Kansas
Works Progress Administration in Kansas
WPA Rustic architecture
Community centers in the United States